Zartonk (in Armenian Զարթօնք) was a short-lived Armenian Turkish publication founded by P. Shamlian in 1932. It stopped publication in 1933. It covered the Armenian Turkish political, cultural and literary activities in Turkey and worldwide. It published Axel Bakunts' work Khachatur Abovian (In Armenian «Խաչատուր Աբովյան») and Yervant Odian's Twelve Years Outside Bolis (In Armenian «Տասերկու տարի Պոլսեն դուրս») as well as translations from important European literature.

Defunct newspapers published in Turkey
Daily newspapers published in Turkey
Publications established in 1932
Publications disestablished in 1933
1932 establishments in Turkey